Interpretations: The British Rock Songbook is a studio album by soul musician Bettye LaVette, which covers songs by British rock legends such as The Beatles, Elton John, Led Zeppelin, Pink Floyd, and more. The album was released in 2010 under ANTI- Records. On June 21, 2010, it charted at number 1 on the U.S. Billboard's Top Blues Albums, where it was in the charts for 39 weeks.

Track listing

Personnel
Bettye LaVette - vocals
Shane Fontayne - guitar
Rob Mathes - keyboards, acoustic and electric guitar
Zev Katz - electric bass, double bass
Charley Drayton - drums, percussion
Andy Snitzer - tenor saxophone
Aaron Heick - alto saxophone
Jeff Kievit - trumpet
Michael Davis - trombone
James "D-Train" Williams, Rob Mathes, Tabitha Fair, Vaneese Thomas - backing vocals

Charts

References

2012 albums
Bettye LaVette albums
albums produced by Rob Mathes
Anti- (record label) albums